This is a list of elementary schools in Chiba Prefecture.

Municipal schools

Chiba City
This is a list of elementary schools of Chiba City:

 Chuo-ku

 Benten (弁天小学校)
 Daiganji (大巌寺小学校)
 Honcho (本町小学校)
 Hoshikuki (星久喜小学校)
 Innai (院内小学校)
 Kawado (川戸小学校)
 Matsugaoka (松ケ丘小学校)
 Miyako (都小学校)
 Miyazaki (宮崎小学校)
 Nitona (仁戸名小学校)
 Nobuto (登戸小学校)
 Oihama (生浜小学校)
 Oihama Higashi (生浜東小学校)
 Oihama Nishi (生浜西小学校)
 Omori (大森小学校)
 Samugawa (寒川小学校)
 Shinjuku (新宿小学校)
 Soga (蘇我小学校)
 Tsurusawa (鶴沢小学校)

 Hanamigawa-ku

 Asahigaoka (朝日ケ丘小学校)
 Hanamigawa (花見川小学校)
 Hanamigawa No. 3 (花見川第三小学校)
 Hanashima (花島小学校)
 Hanazono (花園小学校)
 Hata (畑小学校)
 Kashiwai (柏井小学校)
 Kemigawa (検見川小学校)
 Kotehashi (犢橋小学校)
 Kotehashidai (こてはし台小学校)
 Makuhari (幕張小学校)
 Makuhari Higashi (幕張東小学校)
 Makuhari Minami (幕張南小学校)
 Mizuho (瑞穂小学校)
 Nagasaku (長作小学校)
 Nishikonakadai (西小中台小学校)
 Nishinoya (西の谷小学校)
 Sakushin (作新小学校)
 Satsukigaoka Higashi (さつきが丘東小学校)
 Satsukigaoka Nishi (さつきが丘西小学校)
 Uenodai (上の台小学校)
 Yokodo (横戸小学校)

 Inage-ku

 Ayamedai (あやめ台小学校)
 Chigusadai (千草台小学校)
 Chigusadai Higashi (千草台東小学校)
 Inagaoka (稲丘小学校)
 Inage (稲毛小学校)
 Kashiwadai (柏台小学校)
 Konakadai (小中台小学校)
 Konakadai Minami (小中台南小学校)
 Kusano (草野小学校)
 Midorimachi (緑町小学校)
 Miyanogi (宮野木小学校)
 Sanno (山王小学校)
 Sonno (園生小学校)
 Todorokicho (轟町小学校)
 Tsuga (都賀小学校)
 Yayoi (弥生小学校)

 Midori-ku

 Ariyoshi (有吉小学校)
 Asumigaoka (あすみが丘小学校)
 Hirayama (平山小学校)
 Honda (誉田小学校)
 Honda Higashi (誉田東小学校)
 Izumiya (泉谷小学校)
 Kanezawa (金沢小学校)
 Koyatsu (小谷小学校)
 Ochi (越智小学校)
 Ogida (扇田小学校)
 Oji (大椎小学校)
 Okido (大木戸小学校)
 Oyumino Minami (おゆみ野南小学校)
 Shiina (椎名小学校)
 Toke (土気小学校)
 Toke Minami (土気南小学校)

 Mihama-ku

 Kaihin Utase (海浜打瀬小学校)
 Inage No. 2 (稲毛第二小学校)
 Inahama (稲浜小学校)
 Isobe (磯辺小学校)
 Isobe No. 3 (磯辺第三小学校)
 Makuhari Nishi (幕張西小学校
 Masago No. 5 (真砂第五小学校)
 Masago Higashi (真砂東小学校)
 Masago Nishi (真砂西小学校)
 Mihama Utase (美浜打瀬小学校)
 Saiwaicho (幸町小学校)
 Saiwaicho No. 3 (幸町第三小学校)
 Takahama No. 1 (高浜第一小学校)
 Takahama Kaihin (高浜海浜小学校)
 Takasu (高洲小学校)
 Takasu No. 3 (高洲第三小学校)
 Takasu No. 4 (高洲第四小学校)
 Utase (打瀬小学校)

 Wakaba-ku

 Chishiro (千城小学校)
 Chishirodai Higashi (千城台東小学校)
 Chishirodai Mirai (千城台みらい小学校)
 Chishirodai Wakaba (千城台わかば小学校)
 Kita Kaizuka (北貝塚小学校)
 Minamoto (源小学校)
 Mitsuwadai Kita (みつわ台北小学校)
 Mitsuwadai Minami (みつわ台南小学校)
 Ogura (小倉小学校)
 Omiya (大宮小学校)
 Sakazuki (坂月小学校)
 Sakuragi (桜木小学校)
 Sarashima (更科小学校)
 Shirai (白井小学校)
 Tsuganodai (都賀の台小学校)
 Wakamatsu (若松小学校)
 Wakamatsudai (若松台小学校)

 Former elementary schools

 Hanamigawa-ku
 Hanamigawa No. 1 (花見川第一小学校)
 Hanamigawa No. 2 (花見川第二小学校)
 Hanamigawa No. 4 (花見川第四小学校)
 Hanamigawa No. 5 (花見川第五小学校)
 Mihama-ku
 Isobe No. 1 (磯辺第一小学校)
 Isobe No. 2 (磯辺第二小学校)
 Isobe No. 4 (磯辺第四小学校)
 Masago No. 1 (真砂第一小学校)
 Masago No. 2 (真砂第二小学校)
 Masago No. 3 (真砂第三小学校)
 Masago No. 4 (真砂第四小学校)
 Saiwaicho No. 1 (幸町第一小学校)
 Saiwaicho No. 2 (幸町第二小学校)
 Saiwaicho No. 4 (幸町第四小学校)
 Takahama No. 2 (高浜第二小学校)
 Takahama No. 3 (高浜第三小学校)
 Takasu No. 1 (高洲第一小学校)
 Takasu No. 2 (高洲第二小学校)
 Wakaba-ku
 Chishirodai Asahi (千城台旭小学校)
 Chishirodai Kita (千城台北小学校)
 Chishirodai Minami (千城台南小学校)
 Chishirodai Nishi (千城台西小学校)
 Omiyadai (大宮台小学校)

Kyonan
 Kyonan Elementary School (鋸南小学校)

The former Katsuyama Elementary School (勝山小学校) and Yasuda Elementary School (保田小学校) merged into Kyonan Elementary in 2014, with the Katsuyama building becoming the Kyonan Elementary building.

Narita

Municipal combined elementary and junior high schools:

 Shimofusa Midori Gakuen (下総みどり学園)
 Taiei Mirai Gakuen (大栄みらい学園)

Municipal elementary schools:

 Azuma (吾妻小学校)
 Habu (八生小学校)
 Hashigadai (橋賀台小学校)
 Heisei (平成小学校)
 Honjo (本城小学校)
 Jinguji (神宮寺小学校)
 Karabe (加良部小学校)
 Kouzu (公津小学校)
 Kouzunomori (公津の杜小学校)
 Kuzumi (久住小学校)
 Misatodai (美郷台小学校)
 Mukoudai (向台小学校)
 Nakadai (中台小学校)
 Narita (成田小学校)
 Niiyama (新山小学校)
 Sanrizuka (三里塚小学校)
 Tamatsukuri (玉造小学校)
 Tohyama (遠山小学校)
 Toyosumi (豊住小学校)

Urayasu
Municipal elementary schools:

 Akemi (明海小学校)
 Akemi Minami (明海南小学校)
 Higashi (東小学校)
 Higashino (東野小学校)
 Hinode (日の出小学校)
 Hinode Minami (日の出南小学校)
 Hokubu (北部小学校)
 Irifune (入船小学校)
 Maihama (舞浜小学校)
 Miakegawa (見明川小学校)
 Mihama Kita (美浜北小学校)
 Mihama Minami (美浜南小学校)
 Minami (南小学校)
 Takasu (高洲小学校)
 Takasu Kita (高洲北小学校)
 Tomioka (富岡小学校)
 Urayasu (浦安小学校)

Other municipalities

Hota Shiosai Elementary School (保田しおさい学校) is physically located in Kyonan, but it is a municipally-operated school by Katsushika City, Tokyo.

Private
 Chiba Korean Primary and Junior High School
 Makuhari International School

See also
 List of high schools in Chiba Prefecture
 List of junior high schools in Chiba Prefecture

References

Schools in Chiba Prefecture
Chiba Prefecture